The Appalachian State Mountaineers wrestling team represents Appalachian State University of Boone, North Carolina. The squad is coached by JohnMark Bentley. Bentley is assisted by Randall Diabe. The Mountaineers are full members of the non-wrestling Sun Belt Conference, with the wrestling team competing as an Associate member of the Southern Conference (SoCon).

The Mountaineers have won thirteen regular season SoCon titles and nine SoCon championship tournaments, the most recent for both being in 2023.

Notable former Mountaineer wrestlers include Olympians Al Crawford (1948), Herb Singerman (1968), Ike Anderson (1988 and 1992), and Dale Oliver (1988). The school has had eight wrestlers earn eleven All-American honors in the NCAA and seven wrestlers earn ten honors in the NAIA.

References

External links
 Mountaineers wrestling webpage